Alburnus arborella is a species of ray-finned fish in the carp family Cyprinidae. It is a freshwater fish occurring in lakes and streams in Europe. It is distributed in Croatia, Italy, Slovenia, and Switzerland.

This species is up to 10 centimeters long. It eats plankton and invertebrates such as insects. It spawns in riffles and on lakeshores.

This is an abundant fish and it is not considered to be a threatened species.

References

arborella
Fish described in 1841
Taxa named by Charles Lucien Bonaparte